Oxyptilus erebites is a moth of the family Pterophoridae described by Edward Meyrick in 1937. It is known from the Democratic Republic of the Congo.

References

Oxyptilini
Plume moths of Africa
Moths of Africa
Moths described in 1937
Endemic fauna of the Democratic Republic of the Congo